Blinding may refer to:
Blinding (punishment)
Blinding (cryptography)
Blinding (novel), a novel by Mircea Cărtărescu
The Blinding EP
"The Blinding" (song), a song by Jay Electronica
"Blinding", a song by Florence and the Machine from  Lungs

See also
 Auto-da-Fé (novel) or Die Blendung, a novel by Elias Canett
 Blind experiment, in which the researcher is not aware of which data points were generated by an intervention
 Blindness